Corb Lund is a Canadian country and western singer-songwriter from Taber, Alberta, Canada. He has released eleven albums, three of which are certified gold. Lund tours regularly in Canada, the United States and Australia, and has received several awards in Canada and abroad.

Biography
Corb Lund grew up in Southern Alberta living on his family's farm and ranches near Taber, Cardston and Rosemary. Lund left his hometown of Taber and moved to Edmonton, where he enrolled in the Grant MacEwan College to study jazz guitar and bass.

Lund was a founding member of The Smalls. The band retired in the fall of 2001 but reunited in 2014 for a string of shows, the so-called "Slight Return" tour.

Lund formed his country trio, the Corb Lund Band, in 1995. He turned his attention to his own band exclusively when the Smalls broke up in 2001. The band changed its name to "Corb Lund and the Hurtin' Albertans" in 2005 shortly after guitarist Grant Siemens joined the group, and has been touring and recording under that title ever since.

Other media
Lund starred as the 50-year-old oilfield contractor Ray Mitchell in the 2022 Canadian film Guitar Lessons.

Personal life
Lund currently lives in Lethbridge, Alberta, and spends much of his downtime at his family ranch south of Cardston, Alberta.

The Hurtin' Albertans

Corb Lund and the Hurtin' Albertans are a Canadian country music band, formerly known as the Corb Lund Band. The Hurtin' Albertans is Lund's touring band. They have released nine albums to critical acclaim. The band tours regularly in Canada, the United States and Australia. Much of their time is spent in the Canadian Prairies and the American southwest.

The band's members are:
Kurt Ciesla, bass
Grant "Demon" Siemens, guitar and other strings
Brady Valgardson, drums

Siemens is the only member who is not Albertan, hailing from Winnipeg, Manitoba. Farmer/drummer Valgardson and Lund are from Taber, Alberta.

The band has toured Europe, where they played the UK Glastonbury Festival, and Australia several times. The group was featured in the movie "Slither" (2006) and were part of the soundtrack to the 2008 documentary, "Holler Back: (Not) Voting in an American Town." They have also provided accompaniment for an NBC special in 2006, on which former world figure skating champion and fellow Albertan, Kurt Browning, performed a routine to "Expectation and the Blues". Their music can also be heard in the ski film "Nine Winters Old."

Lund signed a three-album deal with New West Records (home of Dwight Yoakam, Steve Earle, Kris Kristofferson and other major artists) in 2009. His first record on New West, Losin' Lately Gambler, was released in September 2009.

Corb Lund and the Hurtin' Albertans played their 2009 single "Long Gone to Saskatchewan" in Ottawa for the 2011 Canada Day ceremonies in the presence of the newlywed Duke and Duchess of Cambridge on their Royal visit to Canada.

Corb Lund and the Hurtin' Albertans released their seventh studio album, Cabin Fever, on August 14, 2012. It debuted at number 1 on the Billboard Canadian Albums Chart. In June 2013, the album was longlisted for the 2013 Polaris Music Prize.

Corb Lund released Things That Can't Be Undone in 2015. Lund worked with producer Dave Cobb (Sturgill Simpson, Chris Stapleton, Jason Isbell) to explore new styles and sounds on the album. The album appeared on the !earshot National Top 50 Chart in December that year.

Discography

Studio albums
{| class="wikitable plainrowheaders" style="text-align:center;"
|-
! rowspan="2" style="width:18em;"| Title
! rowspan="2" style="width:26em;"| Album details
! colspan="3"| Peak chart positions
! rowspan="2" style="width:9em;"| Certifications(sales threshold)
|- style="font-size:smaller;"
! style="width:45px;"| CAN
! style="width:45px;"| US Country
! style="width:45px;"| USHeat
|-
! scope="row"| Modern Pain
| 
 Release date: October 13, 1995
 Label: Outside Music
 Formats: CD, cassette
| —
| —
| —
| 
|-
! scope="row"| Unforgiving Mistress
| 
 Release date: October 22, 1999
 Label: Outside Music
 Formats: CD, cassette
| —
| —
| —
| 
|-
! scope="row"| Five Dollar Bill
| 
 Release date: June 11, 2002
 Label: Stony Plain Records, Loose Music (Europe)
 Formats: CD
| —
| —
| —
| style="text-align:left;"| 
 CAN: Gold
|-
! scope="row"| Hair in My Eyes Like a Highland Steer
| 
 Release date: September 6, 2005
 Label: Stony Plain Records, Loose Music (Europe)
 Formats: CD, digital download
| —
| —
| —
| style="text-align:left;"| 
 CAN: Gold
|-
! scope="row"| Horse Soldier! Horse Soldier!
| 
 Release date: November 13, 2007
 Label: Stony Plain Records
 Formats: CD, digital download
| 25
| —
| —
| 
 CAN: Gold
|-
! scope="row"| Losin' Lately Gambler
| 
 Release date: September 22, 2009
 Label: New West Records
 Formats: CD, LP, digital download
| 20
| —
| —
| 
|-
! scope="row"| Cabin Fever
| 
 Release date: August 14, 2012
 Label: New West Records
 Formats: CD, LP, digital download
| 1
| 51
| 13
| 
|-
! scope="row"| Counterfeit Blues
| 
 Release date: June 17, 2014
 Label: New West Records
 Formats: CD, LP, digital download
| —
| —
| —
| 
|-
! scope="row"| Things That Can't Be Undone
| 
 Release date: October 9, 2015
 Label: New West Records
 Formats: CD, digital download
| 8
| 37
| 10
| 
|-
! scope="row"| Agricultural Tragic
|
 Release date: June 26, 2020
 Label: New West Records
 Formats: CD, LP, digital download, streaming
| 31
| 31
| —
|
|-
! scope="row"| Songs My Friends Wrote
|
 Release date: April 29, 2022
 Label: Warner
 Formats: CD, LP, digital download, streaming
| —
| —
| —
|
|-
| colspan="6" style="font-size:8pt"| "—" denotes releases that did not chart
|}

Extended plays

Singles

Music videos

Awards and achievements

 JUNO Awards (Canada) 

  Canadian Country Music Association Awards 

Corb Lund Band

Corb Lund

 Americana Music Honors & Awards 
2010 Emerging Artist of the Year (nominated)
2010 Albums of the Year: No. 38

Gold Records
2002: Five Dollar Bill (As ranked by the Canadian Recording Industry Association)
2005: Hair in My Eyes Like a Highland Steer (As ranked by the Canadian Recording Industry Association)
2007: Horse Soldier! Horse Soldier! (As ranked by the Canadian Recording Industry Association)

 Western Canadian Music Awards 
2008 Outstanding Roots Recording (WON)
2006 Outstanding Independent Recording (WON)
2006 Outstanding Roots Recording (WON)
2006 Songwriter of the Year (WON)
2005 Entertainer of the Year (WON)
2003 Outstanding Album (Independent) (WON)
 2017 Roots Solo Artist of the Year

Edmonton Music Awards (Canada)
2013 Male Artist of the Year (WON)
2013 Country Artist of the Year (WON)
2013 People's Choice Award (WON)
2013 Best Country Artist (nominated)

Edmonton Mayor's Celebration of the Arts Awards (Canada)
2013 Ambassador of the Arts (WON)

CMC Music Awards (Australia)
2011 International Artist of the Year (nominated)

 Canadian Folk Music Awards 
2008 English Songwriter of the Year (WON)

U.S. Independent Music Awards
2007 Best Folk/Singer-Songwriter Album (nominated)
2003 Country/Bluegrass Album of the Year (nominated)

Country Music Association (Australia)
2007 Global Country Artist Award (nominated)

Indie Acoustic Project
Best Lyrics, "Best CDs of 2007" Awards (WON)
Best Male Singer-Songwriter, "Best CDs of 2006" Awards (nominated)

The Indies (Canadian Independent Music Awards)
2008 Favourite Folk Artist/Group (WON)
2007 Favourite Country Artist, Group or Duo of the Year (WON)
2006 Favourite Folk Artist/Group (WON)

French Association of Country Music (France)
2006 Independent Artist of the Year (WON)
2005 Independent Artist of the Year (WON)

Canadian Association for Campus Activities
2007 Best Contemporary Music (Recording) (WON)

Artist also appears on

2005
Carolyn Mark – Just Married: An Album of Duets, "Sweet Thing", Mint

2006
Various Artists – Untitled Promo CD PROC 515, "Hair In My Eyes Like A Highland Steer", Warner Music Canada
Various Artists – Slither: Music from the Motion Picture, "(Gonna) Shine Up My Boots", Bulletproof Recording Company Inc.
Various Artists – 30 Years of Stony Plain, "The Truth Comes Out", Stony Plain Records
Various Artists – Worlds Best Award Winning Country Vol. 5- World's Best Award Winning Country CD, "Truck Got Stuck", Pid

2007
Various Artists – Gift: A Tribute to Ian Tyson, "MC Horses", Stony Plain Records

2009
Various Artists – AB2 Alberta's Playlist, "A Leader On Losing Control", Alberta Foundation For The Arts

2010Great Canadian Song Quest, "The West Just Fades Away", CBC Radio 2
Various Artists – The Americana Music Association, "Devil's Best Dress", Red Ink

2011
Various Artists – Have Not Been The Same Volume One: Too Cool To Live, Too Smart To Die, "In Contempt Of Me", Zunior Records

2013
Various Artists – Festival Man: Truly Great Artists Playing Geoff Berner's Songs, "That's What Keeps The Rent Down", Dundurn

2014
Various Artists – An Americana Christmas'', "Just Me And These Ponies (For Christmas This Year)", New West Records

Charity work
In March 2008, the United Nations Children's Fund announced that the band had donated the use of the song "Horse Soldier, Horse Soldier" as the theme song of UNICEF Team Canada, the Canadian national equestrian skill-at-arms team, to support the team's work with UNICEF to provide food and medical care to AIDS orphans and infants infected with HIV in the global south.

In March 2010, Lund appeared as part of Young Artists for Haiti to record a benefit version of K'naan's song "Wavin' Flag".

On July 11, 2010, Lund headlined the Medicine Hat Flood Relief Show, which raised $68,000 for Canadian Red Cross 2010 Flood Relief campaign, which benefits those affected by the disastrous flooding in Southern Alberta.

Lund has supported the Centre for Family Literacy in Edmonton, Alberta since 2010.

Lund co-hosted and headlined the "Fire Aid" benefit concert supporting victims of the Fort McMurray wildfire at Edmonton's Commonwealth Stadium in 2016.

In 2021, Lund publicly expressed opposition to proposed coal mines in the foothills of the Rocky Mountains, citing concerns of fellow southern Alberta ranchers about possible water pollution. In June 2021, Lund held a small benefit concert in support of landowners.

References

External links
Corb Lund official website
Corb Lund at New West Records
 

 Article at thecanadianencyclopedia.ca

Juno Award for Roots & Traditional Album of the Year – Solo winners
1995 establishments in Alberta
Canadian country singer-songwriters
Canadian Folk Music Award winners
Stony Plain Records artists
New West Records artists
Canadian Country Music Association Album of the Year winners